Technet may refer to:

 Technet (comics), a fictional group in the Marvel Comics universe
 TechNet (computer network), Singapore's first Internet access provider
 Microsoft TechNet, a former resource for IT professionals

See also
 Technetium (symbol Tc), a chemical element with atomic number 43